Nicholas Hyett (1709-1777) was a lawyer and justice of the peace in Gloucester, England, and one of the last keepers and constables of the Castle of Gloucester.

Life
Nicholas Hyett was born in 1709 to Charles Hyett (1677 or 1686 - 1738), member of Parliament for Gloucester 1722–1727. He was the grandson of Benjamin Hyett (1651-1711). He had a brother Benjamin Hyett II (1708–62) who was responsible for the Rococo garden at Painswick House.

Hyett became a lawyer and justice of the peace, and in 1765 was granted by letters patent the office of keeper and constable of the Castle of Gloucester by King George III. By that time the office was largely honorary as the castle had long since been reduced just to a keep which was used as a gaol. His father Charles had been granted the same office in 1715.

Nicholas and Benjamin Hyett, stood as Tories for the parliamentary constituency of Gloucester unsuccessfully in 1734 and 1741.

Hyett was probably responsible for the current façade of Hyatt House, a grade II listed building in Westgate Street, Gloucester.

Family
Hyett had a son Benjamin, who was appointed a freeman of Gloucester in 1762.

Death
Hyett died in 1777. His Will is held by the British National Archives at Kew.

References

External links
http://www.bgas.org.uk/code/genindex.php?query=hyett
http://www.independent.co.uk/property/gardening/gardening-scene-by-the-limner-of-bath-in-the-first-of-an-occasional-series-on-gardens-in-paintings-anna-pavord-looks-at-thomas-robinss-18thcentury-study-of-painswick-in-gloucestershire-1481779.html
http://www.bbc.co.uk/news/uk-england-gloucestershire-32914568

1709 births
1777 deaths
English lawyers
Hyett family
English justices of the peace